
Good Germans is an ironic term — usually placed between single quotes such as 'Good Germans' — referring to German citizens during and after World War II who claimed not to have supported the Nazi regime, but remained silent and did not resist in a meaningful way.<ref>Frank Richoct, "The ‘Good Germans’ Among Us", New York Times, (October 14, 2007).</ref> The term is further used to describe those who claimed ignorance of the Holocaust and German war crimes

Pól Ó Dochartaigh and Christiane Schönfeld state in non-ironic way: "After the division of Germany in 1949, finding “good Germans” whose record helped legitimize each of the new German states became a core aspect of building a new nation in Germany and of the propaganda battle in this respect between the two German states."

See also

  German collective guilt
 Italiani brava gente
 Résistancialisme Responsibility for the Holocaust
 The Good German'' – a 2006 Steven Soderbergh film
 Wehrkraftzersetzung

Citations

German people of World War II
German culture
The Holocaust